Rutgers (formerly known as the Rutgers Stichting, of Rutgers WPF) is a Dutch expert centre on sexuality, based in Utrecht.

Rutgers was established in 1999 as the result of a fusion between Rutgers Stichting (1969) and Nisso (1967). Rutgers consists of two departments: Research and Development, and Implementation. They also have a Youth Sex Offender project and a Youth Incentives programme to promote sexual health. It is the International Planned Parenthood Federation's affiliate in the Netherlands.

Ministries, municipalities, care institutions, educational institutes, pressure groups, but also companies make use of their expertise.

External links 
Official website

Sexology organizations
Non-profit organisations based in the Netherlands
International Planned Parenthood Federation affiliates